Atlantic Beach is the name of some places in the United States:

Atlantic Beach, Florida, a city
Atlantic Beach, New York, a village
Atlantic Beach, North Carolina, a town
Atlantic Beach, South Carolina, a town

See also 
 Atlantic (disambiguation)